James Gelfand  (born April 3, 1959) is a Canadian jazz pianist who has written scores for film and television.

Early life
Gelfand was born in Montreal, Quebec, Canada into a large Jewish family. He is the great-grandson of Jacob Pascal, founder of J. Pascal's Hardware and Furniture. He is married with two children.

He began classical piano training at the age of four. During his teens, Gelfand diverged into jazz and other styles. Performing and competing at jazz festivals throughout North America and Europe, he has won a number of prestigious awards.

Professional career
Gelfand recorded a number of cross-over albums combining jazz and classical styles. He has performed on over 40 albums, with 8 under his own name. During his earlier career, he established The James Gelfand Trio and The James Gelfand Group.

With his ability to compose in various styles such as techno, orchestral, folk, and jazz, Gelfand began writing score for film and television. He has composed the music for over 30 films and 300 television broadcasts.

Discography

As leader or co-leader
 Neverland (CBC Records, 1988)
 Time Zones (Silence Records, 1996)
 Setting the Standard with Michel Donato (Unidisc, 1996)
 Children's Standards +1+2+3 (Lost Chart, 1998)
 Mother Tree (Effendi, 2002)
 Convergence (Unidisc, 2003)
 Exploding Sun (Kronos/Moviescore, 2013)
 Ground Midnight (Analekta, 2018)

As sideman or guest
With Michel Donato
 1997 Live
 2003 Setting the Standard Vol. 2

With Sylvain Gagnon
 1991 Crepuscule
 1997 Readers of the Lost Chart

With Jean-Pierre Zanella
 1995 Caminho
 1997 Mystic Infancy
 1999 Puzzle City
 2006 Villa-Lobos-Jobim

With others
 1994 Hymn to the Earth, Sonny Greenwich
 1995 Rhythm 'n' Jazz, Alain Caron
 1996 Welcome: Mother Earth, Meantime
 1998 A Time for Love, Charito
 1998 Marin Nasturica & Friends, Marin Nasturica
 1998 Tricycle, Helmut Lipsky
 2000 Arthur's Perfect Christmas, Arthur
 2001 Arthur's Really Rockin' Music Mix, Arthur & Friends

Film and television

Sous un Ciel Variable – 1995
Virginie - 1996
Max the Cat - 1996
Investigating Tarzan - 1997
Kit & Kaboodle - 1998
The Country Mouse and the City Mouse Adventures - 1998
Journey to the West – Legends of the Monkey King - 1999 (English version)
Are You Afraid of the Dark? - 1999-2000
The Orphan Muses (Les Muses orphelines) - 2000
Sagwa, the Chinese Siamese Cat - 2001
Wicked Minds - 2002
Deadly Betrayal - 2002
The Rendering - 2002
Scent of Danger - 2002
Silent Night - 2002
Student Seduction - 2003
Wicked Minds - 2003
Wall of Secrets - 2003
The Clinic - 2004
Jack Paradise: Montreal by Night (Jack Paradise : Les nuits de Montréal) - 2004
Fries with That? - 2004
Pinocchio 3000 - 2004
Baby for Sale - 2004
False Pretenses - 2004
Crimes of Passion - 2005
Lies and Deception - 2005
Forbidden Secrets - 2005
Swarmed - 2005
Flirting with Danger - 2006
Black Widower - 2006
Proof of Lies - 2006
Thrill of the Kill - 2006
Mind Over Murder - 2006
Legacy of Fear - 2006
Doctor*ology - 2007
Housesitter - 2007
Blind Trust - 2007
A Life Interrupted - 2007
St. Urbain's Horseman - 2007
The Double Life of Eleanor Kendall - 2008
Swamp Devil - 2008
Secrets of the Summer House - 2008
An Old Fashioned Thanksgiving - 2008
Crusoe - 2009
The Christmas Choir - 2008
Hidden Crimes - 2009
Final Verdict - 2009
High Plains Invaders - 2009
Killer Hair - 2009
Perfect Plan - 2010
The Night Before the Night Before Christmas - 2010
The Mysteries of Alfred Hedgehog - 2010
Web of Lies - 2009
High Plains Invaders - 2009
Naked Science - 2008-2009
Hostile Makeover - 2009
Cyberbully - 2011
Desperately Seeking Santa - 2011
Bullet in the Face - 2012
Northpole - 2014

Awards and honours
 1989 Thelonious Monk International Piano Competition - Performed in Washington, DC in semifinals
 1991 2nd Place The Great American Jazz Piano Competition Jacksonville Jazz Festival - International Competition
 1992 ADISQ nomination - Arranger of the Year - Children's Standards
 1992 Winner of the Montreal International Jazz Festival Competition (James Gelfand Trio)
 1995 Juno Award - Best Contemporary Jazz Album - The Merlin Factor
 1997 Juno nomination - Best Contemporary Jazz Album - Time Zones (James Gelfand Group)
 1997 Keyboardist of the Year - Jazz Report Magazine Awards
 1998 Keyboardist of the Year - Jazz Report Magazine Awards
 1999 Keyboardist of the Year - Jazz Report Magazine Awards
 2000 Keyboardist of the Year - Jazz Report Magazine Awards
 2001 Jutra Award - Best Original Score - Les Muses Orphelines
 2003 Gemini Award nomination - Best Dramatic Score - Silent Night
 2005 Jutra nomination - Best Music - Jack Paradise (Les nuits de Montréal)
 2005 SOCAN Award - International Television Series Music Award
 2006 SOCAN Award - International Television Series Music Award
 2007 SOCAN Award - International Film Series Music Award
 2008 Gemini Award nomination - Best Original Music Score for a Dramatic Program, Mini-Series or TV Movie - St. Urbain's Horseman

References

External links

Discogs.com
[ Allmusic.com]

1959 births
Canadian film score composers
Canadian jazz pianists
Juno Award winners
Living people
Male film score composers
Musicians from Montreal
Canadian male pianists
21st-century Canadian pianists
21st-century Canadian male musicians
Canadian male jazz musicians